United Arab Emirates competed at the 2004 Summer Paralympics in Athens, Greece. The team included 10 athletes. Competitors from United Arab Emirates won 4 medals, including 1 gold, 1 silver and 2 bronze to finish 51st in the medal table.

Medallists

Sports

Athletics

Men's track

Men's field

Powerlifting

See also
United Arab Emirates at the Paralympics
United Arab Emirates at the 2004 Summer Olympics

References 

Nations at the 2004 Summer Paralympics
2004
Summer Paralympics